Aleph: Historical Studies in Science & Judaism is a peer-reviewed academic journal on Jewish history and the history of science. It is published by Indiana University Press in conjunction with the Sidney M. Edelstein Center for the History and Philosophy of Science, Technology and Medicine at the Hebrew University of Jerusalem. It began publication in 2001; the founding editor was Gad Freudenthal. , Reimund Leicht and Resianne Fontaine serve as co-editors.

Abstracting and indexing
Aleph is indexed in:
Academic Search Premier
Arts and Humanities Citation Index
ATLA Religion Database
Humanities Abstracts
IBZ Online
Index Islamicus
Jewish Studies Source
Modern Language Association Database
Scopus

References

External links

Sidney M. Edelstein Center

Judaic studies journals
History of science journals
Indiana University Press academic journals
Publications established in 2001